Sir John Borough, sometimes Burroughs, (died 21 October 1643) was the Garter Principal King of Arms 1633-43.

Life
He was grandson of William Borough, of Sandwich, Kent, by the daughter of Basil Gosall, of Nieuwkerk, Brabant, and son of John Borough, of Sandwich, by his wife, daughter of Robert Denne, of Dennehill, Kent. He received a classical education, and afterwards studied law at Gray's Inn. In 1622 he was at Venice, and from that city he addressed several letters to Sir Robert Bruce Cotton, chiefly about the purchase of manuscripts, subscribing himself ‘Your faithful servant and poore kinsman’.

He was appointed in 1623 Keeper of the Records in the Tower of London. In June of the same year, by the favour of the earl marshal, to whom he was secretary, he was sworn herald-extraordinary by the title of Mowbray, and on 23 December following he was created Norroy king of arms, at Arundel House in the Strand, in the place of Sir Richard St. George, who was created Clarenceux king of arms. He was M.P. for Horsham 1624, 1625, and 1626. On 17 July 1624 he was knighted, and in 1634 made Garter principal king of arms in the place of Sir William Segar, who had died.

As keeper of the records, when King Charles I was discussing the propriety of summoning the great council of peers, Borough was called in with records respecting those assemblies. He attended his sovereign when he went to Scotland to be crowned in 1633. On 14 April 1636 he obtained a grant to entitle him to the fees and perquisites of his office of Garter while employed beyond the seas for the king's special service. As principal king of arms he followed the fortunes of his sovereign in the field during the First English Civil War, and had several narrow escapes while in the royal camp. For instance, Edward Norgate, Windsor herald, writing from Berwick to his cousin Thomas Read, on 3 June 1639, says that the king's tent was shot through once, and Sir John Borough's twice.

Borough was a good note-taker, and drew up accounts of various conferences between the royalists and the parliamentarians. The notes of the interview between Charles and the covenanters in the earl marshal's tent near Berwick on 11 June 1639 were probably taken by him. When the great council met at York he was appointed its clerk, and in that capacity he took the full notes of its proceedings which constitute the only record we possess of what took place in that assembly. Again, when the sixteen commissioners went to Ripon, Borough accompanied them as their clerk, and took notes of the treaty there. Finally when the treaty was adjourned to London, Borough resumed his attendance upon the commissioners, and carried on his notes until the treaty was concluded.

While in the service of the court at Oxford the university conferred upon him the degree of D.C.L. on 5 August 1643. He died about two months afterwards, on 21 October 1643, at Oxford, and was buried the next day at the upper end of the divinity chapel adjoining, on the north side, the choir of Christ Church Cathedral.

Arms

References

Attribution

Sources

External links
 

1643 deaths
Year of birth unknown
English officers of arms
English MPs 1621–1622
English MPs 1624–1625
English MPs 1625
English MPs 1626
Garter Principal Kings of Arms